R. K. Kothari is an Indian education administrator. He is the Vice Chancellor of University of Rajasthan, Jaipur on 10 July 2017.

References

Living people
Heads of universities and colleges in India
Year of birth missing (living people)